The Congress of the Republic is the unicameral legislature of the Republic of Guatemala. The Guatemalan Congress is made up of 160 deputies who are elected by direct universal suffrage to serve four-year terms. The electoral system is closed party list proportional representation. 31 of the deputies are elected on a nationwide list, whilst the remaining 127 deputies are elected in 22 multi-member constituencies. Each of Guatemalas's 22 departments serves as a district, with the exception of the department of Guatemala containing the capital, which on account of its size is divided into two  (distrito central and distrito Guatemala). Departments are allocated seats based on their population size and they are shown in the table below.

Deputies by Department

History  
Guatemala had a bicameral legislature in the 1845 constitution. It was replaced with unicameral Chamber of Representatives, which was reformulated as National Assembly in 1879, which was replaced by Congress of the Republic in 1945.

Political culture 
It is not uncommon for deputies to change parties during the legislature's term or to secede from a party and create a new party or congressional block.

Building 
The Congress of the Republic Guatemala is located in the National Palace in Guatemala city.

During the protests against the budget for 2021 on 21 November 2020, protestors entered the building and set parts of it on fire.

Latest election

See also
Politics of Guatemala
List of legislatures by country

Notes

References

External links
 

 

Guatemala
Government of Guatemala
Guatemala
1945 establishments in Guatemala